The 2001–2002 session was a session of the California State Legislature.

Dates of sessions

Major events

Vacancies and special elections
December 1, 2000: After pleading guilty to campaign finance violations, Jan Leja (R) agreed not to take the seat she was elected to in November 2000 for the 65th Assembly District.
January 2001: Senator Hilda Solis (D-24) resigned to take a seat in the United States House of Representatives.
March 6, 2001: Assembly member Gloria Romero (D-49) won the special election in the 24th Senate District to replace Solis.
April 3, 2001: Russ Bogh (R) won the special election in the 65th Assembly District to replace Leja.
May 15, 2001: Judy Chu (D) won the special election in the 49th Assembly District to replace Romero.

Major legislation

Enacted

Pending or failed

Vetoed

Members
Skip to Assembly, below

Senate

  Democrats: 26
  Republicans: 14

The party affiliation and district numbers of Senators are listed after their names in this list.

President Pro Tem: John L. Burton (D-3)
Majority Leader: Richard Polanco (D-22)
Minority Leader: Jim Brulte (R-31)

Assembly
Democrats: 50
Republicans: 30

Officers
Speaker Herb Wesson (D-47) from February 6, 2002
Robert Hertzberg (D-40) to February 6, 2002
Speaker pro Tempore Fred Keeley (D-27)
Assistant Speaker pro Tempore  Christine Kehoe (D-76)
Majority Floor Leader Kevin Shelley (D-12)
Minority Floor Leader Dave Cox (R-5) from March 26, 2001
Bill Campbell (R-71) to March 26, 2001
Chief Clerk  E. Dotson Wilson
Sergeant at Arms  Ronald Pane
Note: The Chief Clerk and the Sergeant at Arms are not Members of the Legislature

Full list of members, 2001-2002

Analysis of Bills

See also
 List of California state legislatures

References 

2000-2001
2001 in California
2002 in sports in California
California
California